Desert of Fire (Italian: Deserto di fuoco) is a 1971 Italian adventure film directed by Renzo Merusi and starring Edwige Fenech, George Wang and Giuseppe Addobbati. The filming locations is in Tunisia.

Cast
  Edwige Fenech as Juana
 George Wang as El Marish 
 Giuseppe Addobbati as Jean
 Pietro Martellanza as Bill
 Zohra Faïza
 Ettore Marcello 
 Carla Mancini 
 Fatma Bentali

References

Bibliography 
 Quinlan, David. Quinlan's illustrated directory of film stars. Batsford, 1996.

External links 
 

1971 films
Italian adventure films
1970s adventure films
1970s Italian-language films
Films directed by Renzo Merusi
1970s Italian films

Films shot in Tunisia